Snět is a municipality and village in Benešov District in the Central Bohemian Region of the Czech Republic. It has about 100 inhabitants.

Geography
It lies in the Křemešník Highlands. The municipality is located on the shore of the Švihov Reservoir, built on the Želivka river.

References

Villages in Benešov District